Erythraeus kastaniensis is a species of mite belonging to the family Erythraeidae, first described from Greece.

References

Further reading
Khanjani, Mohammad, et al. "Two new larval species of Erythraeus (Zaracarus)(Acari: Erythraeidae) from western Iran." Zootaxa 2537 (2010): 19-32.
Mayoral, Jaime G., and Pablo Barranco. "A new species of the genus Erythraeus Latreille, 1806 (Acari: Erythraeidae) from the Gypsum Karst of Sorbas in the south of Spain." Revista Ibérica de Aracnología 16 (2008): 113-117.

Trombidiformes
Arachnids of Europe